Sajid Yahiya (born 20 December 1984) is an Indian film director, actor, producer and music composer who works in Malayalam cinema. His directorial debut was in 2016 with the film IDI - Inspector Dawood Ibrahim. He is the founder of a film production company, CP Film Productions.

Sajid Yahiya is known for his roles in the films Collector, Friday and Bangalore Days. He also directed mainstream films IDI – Inspector Dawood Ibrahim (2016), Mohanlal (2018) and Qalb (2020).

Career
He made his acting debut in Collector directed by Anil C. Menon. His second film, Friday. Apart from acting he was also the executive producer of the film. He was then approached by Roopesh Peethambaran to play a role in Theevram. After this, he acted on Kaashh, Arikil Oraal, and Amen. Other notable films Include Pakida and Bangalore Days. He made his directorial debut in 2016 through the action comedy film IDI - Inspector Dawood Ibrahim. He also directed Mohanlal starring Manju Warrier in 2018, which was a tribute to actor Mohanlal. The film gained recognition among the malayalee audience and the song ‘Laletta’ composed by Tony Joseph from the film was a major hit.

In 2019, he began shooting for Qalb starring Shane Nigam, Siddique, and Lena. The film remains unreleased.

Filmography

References

External links
 

1980 births
Male actors from Alappuzha
Living people
21st-century Indian male actors
Indian male film actors
Male actors in Malayalam cinema